As of June 2014, the discography of Berryz Kobo consists of nine studio albums, and thirty-five singles. They are under Sharam Q vocalist Tsunku, who serves as their lyricist, composer, and producer.

Singles 

* Billboard Japan Hot 100 is published since January 2008, RIAJ Digital Track Chart established in April 2009 and cancelled in July 2012.
*** These are unofficial figures obtained by adding together Oricon sales numbers for different periods of time when the single charted on Oricon.

Albums

DVDs

Filmography

Television
  (2004-01-04–2004-04-02)
  (2004-04-05–2004-10-01)

Radio
  (2004-03-30–)

Concert tours
 2004
 

 2005
 
 
 

 2006
 
 

 2007
 

 2008
 Berryz Kobo Concert Tour 2008 Autumn: Berikore!
 2008 Asia Song Festival

 2009
 Berryz Kobo Concert Tour 2009 Haru: Sono Subete no Ai ni
 Berryz Kobo Concert Tour 2009 Aki: Medachitai!!

 2010
 Berryz Kobo First Live in Bangkok
 Berryz Koubou concert tour 2010 Shoka: Umi no Ie Otakebi House
 Berryz Koubou 2010 Fest

 2011
 Berryz Kobo Kessei 7 Shuunen Kinen Concert Tour 2011 Haru: Shuukan Berryz Times
 Berryz Koubou & ℃-ute Collaboration Concert Tour 2011 Autumn: BeriKyuu Island

 2012
 Berryz Koubou Concert Tour 2012 Haru: Berryz Station

 2013
 Berryz Koubou Concert Tour 2013 Haru: Berryz Mansion Nyuukyosha Boshuuchuu!

Bibliography

Photobooks
May 20, 2005 – 
August 2, 2005 – "Seasonz"
August 25, 2005 – 
December 2, 2005 – 
July 5, 2006 – 
March 3, 201 –

References

Discography
Discographies of Japanese artists
Pop music discographies